Province No. 2 is one of the seven federal provinces of Nepal. The province occupies 6% of the Nepal landmass in the size. Parsa National Park is the attraction of this province.

This is a district wise list of natural monuments in Province No. 2, Nepal as officially recognized by and available through the website of the Ministry of Culture, Tourism and Civil Aviation, Ministry of Forests and Environment and District coordination committee, Nepal.

Saptari District

|}

Siraha District

|}

Dhanusa District

|}

Mahottari District

|}

Sarlahi District

Rautahat District

|}

Bara District

|}

Parsa District

|}

See also 
 List of Natural Monuments in Nepal

References

External links

Natural Monuments of Nepal
Natural monuments, No. 2
Natural monuments
Lakes of Madhesh Province